Newbridge is a town in central Victoria, Australia.

Newbridge was founded as a gold mining town, the Post Office opening on 1 February 1856.

Newbridge is a popular camping and fishing location with campsites available along the river.  The town is host to a Family Fishing Bonanza in February and the "Music for the people" event in March.

It is the birthplace of Arthur Wellesley Bayley who, with William Ford discovered the goldfields of Coolgardie in September 1892, Coolgardie being a town in the vicinity of Kalgoorlie in Western Australia.

The Newbridge Football Netball Club known as the Maroons are an Australian Rules football club competing in the Loddon Valley Football League.

References

External links

Towns in Victoria (Australia)
Shire of Loddon
Mining towns in Victoria (Australia)